Ryan Steven Plackemeier (born March 5, 1984) is a former American football punter. He played college football for Wake Forest University, and earned unanimous All-American honors. He was drafted by the Seattle Seahawks in the seventh round of the 2006 NFL Draft, and also played professionally for the Washington Redskins of the National Football League (NFL).

Early years
Plackemeier was born in Colorado Springs, Colorado.  He attended Fallbrook Union High School in Fallbrook, California, and was a letterman in soccer and football. In soccer, he was a four-year letterman and was twice recognized as his team's most valuable player.  In football, as a senior, he was a first team All-Avocado League selection and was named the North County Times Kicker of the Year.

College career
Plackemeier attended Wake Forest University, where he played for coach Jim Grobe's Wake Forest Demon Deacons football team from 2002 to 2005.  He was a three-time first-team All-Atlantic Coast Conference (ACC) selection (2003, 2004, 2005), and a unanimous first-team All-American (2005).  Following his senior season, he was presented the Ray Guy Award, given annually to the top college punter in the nation.

Professional career

Seattle Seahawks
Plackemeier was selected by the Seattle Seahawks in the seventh round (239th overall pick) of the 2006 NFL Draft and signed to a four-year, $1.65 million contract.

He was released from the Seahawks on September 9, 2008.

Washington Redskins
After beating out fellow veteran punter Josh Miller, Plackemeier was signed by the Redskins on October 14, 2008 due to injuries and poor performance that plagued former punter Durant Brooks.  He became the second consecutive former Ray Guy Award-winning ACC punter to hold the job for the Redskins.

On February 12, 2009, he was waived by the Redskins.

Cincinnati Bengals
Plackemeier was claimed off waivers by the Cincinnati Bengals on February 13, 2009. He was waived on April 28, 2009.

Personal
His father Steve, a math teacher at Mission Vista High School, was a swimmer and played water polo at Southeast Missouri State and uncle, Jim Israel, played basketball and baseball at Wake Forest. He double majored in communication and religion. He is married to his wife Kristen.

References

External links
 Cincinnati Bengals bio
 Wake Forest Demon Deacons bio
 Washington Redskins bio

1984 births
Living people
All-American college football players
American football punters
Cincinnati Bengals players
Players of American football from Colorado Springs, Colorado
Seattle Seahawks players
Wake Forest Demon Deacons football players
Washington Redskins players